Kalpana 2 is a 2016 Indian Kannada-language horror comedy film  directed by R. Anantha Raju and produced by Dr. Rajendra, Shilpa Srinivas and Swamee. It is the second installment after Kalpana and is a remake of the Tamil film Kanchana 2. The film features  Upendra, Priyamani and Avantika Shetty in the lead roles. The film's musical score is by Arjun Janya.

Plot 

Cinematographer Raghav (Upendra) who is scared of ghosts and darkness ends up accompanying Nandini (Avantika Shetty), the girl he fancies, to shoot a reality show about a fake haunted house. As luck would have it, the house ends up being actually haunted and there's more than just adventure that awaits them.

Cast 

 Upendra as Raghav and JadeShiva (double role)
 Priyamani as Kalpana
 Avantika Shetty as Nandini
 Prakash Heggodu
 Victory Vasu
 Ramesh Bhat
 Tulasi Shivamani
 Chitra Shenoy
 Vinaya Prakash
 Muni
 Petrol Prasanna
 Kuri Pratap
 Kuri Rangateja
 Gym Ravi
 Prashanth Siddi 
 Mohan Juneja 
 R. Anantharaju 
 K. M. Rajendra as Special Appearance 
 Kaddipudi Chandru
 Ramesh Babu 
 B. Jaya
 Kote Prabhakar 
 Joe Simon 
 Ramesh Pandith 
 Jyothi Muroor 
 Anusha Sriharsha 
 Chirashree Anchan

Production 
In August 2015, following the success of Upendra's venture Uppi 2, he signed to appear in Kalpana 2 with Naganna directing and Shilpa Srinivas producing. The film was initially planned to start production in September 2015. However the director walked out and R. Anantha Raju replaced him with Dr. Rajendra of Kalla Police fame agreeing to join the production team. The film officially began in November 2015 at the Bull Temple in Bangalore. Actress Priyamani played the role essayed by Nithya Menen in the original version. Avantika Shetty of Rangi Taranga fame got her second assignment from Upendra to reprise the role originally played by Taapsee Pannu in the Tamil film. During a shoot of a Kabbadi match for the film, Upendra sprained his ankle.

Release
The film was dubbed and released in Telugu as Kalpana 3 (2017).

Soundtrack 
The film's score and soundtrack is composed by Arjun Janya. In April 2016, it was reported that actor Puneeth Rajkumar had lent his voice for a patriotic song penned by V. Nagendra Prasad and that would be the introductory song.

References

External links 
 
 Kalpana 2 at Filmibeat

Indian comedy horror films
Kannada remakes of Tamil films
2016 comedy horror films
2010s Kannada-language films
Indian sequel films
Films scored by Arjun Janya
Indian horror film remakes
2016 comedy films